The 2015 Badminton Asia Junior Championships is an 18th edition of the Asia continental junior championships to crown the best U-19 badminton players across Asia. It was held in Bangkok, Thailand, from June 28 to July 5, 2015.

Tournament
The 2015 Badminton Asia Junior Championships organized by the Badminton Association of Thailand and Badminton Asia Confederation. This tournament consists of mixed team competition, which was held from  28 June – 1 July, as well as the five individual events started from 1–5 July.

Venue
This tournament was held at CPB Badminton and Sports Science Training Center in Bangkok, Thailand.

Medalists
In the mixed team event, China team clinched the gold medal by ending the final battle against South Korea in only three straight matches. China made a clean sweep after clinch all the individual events titles.

Medal table

References

External links
Team Event at Tournamentsoftware.com
Individual Event at Tournamentsoftware.com

 
Asia Championships, Junior
 in youth sport
Badminton, Asia Championships, Junior
 in Asian sport
Badminton, Asia Championships, Junior
Asia Championships, Junior
Asia Championships, Junior
Badminton Asia Junior Championships
Badminton, Asia Championships, Junior
Badminton, Asia Championships, Junior